Otto Renner  (25 April 1883 in Neu-Ulm – 8 July 1960) was a German plant geneticist. Following the work of Erwin Baur, Renner established the theory of maternal plastid inheritance as a widely accepted genetic theory.

He studied botany under Karl von Goebel and Ludwig Radlkofer at the University of Munich, and with Wilhelm Pfeffer at the University of Leipzig. From 1913 to 1920 he served as an associate professor of plant physiology at Munich, and afterwards, succeeded Christian Ernst Stahl as chair of botany at the University of Jena, where he was also director of the botanical gardens. In 1946 he returned as a professor to the University of Munich.

Renner worked with plants from the genus Oenothera (evening primroses). His research of hybrid forms of Oenothera contributed significantly to the understanding of mutations.

From 1932 to 1943 he was editor of the botanical journal Flora. He was elected an International member of the American Academy of Arts and Sciences, the United States National Academy of Sciences, and the American Philosophical Society. The plant genus Rennera (family Asteraceae) was named in his honor by Hermann Merxmüller.

Selected works 
 Beiträge zur Anatomie und Systematik der Artocarpeen und Conocephaleen insbesondere der Gattung Ficus, 1906 (doctoral thesis).
 Untersuchungen über die faktorielle Konstitution einiger komplexheterozygotischer Önotheren, 1925.
 Artbastarde bei Pflanzen, 1929.
 Führer durch die Gewächshäuser des Botanischen Gartens München-Nymphenburg, 1951.
 William Bateson und Carl Correns, 1961 – William Bateson and Carl Correns.

References

External links 
 

1883 births
1960 deaths
Foreign associates of the National Academy of Sciences
Foreign Members of the Royal Society
German geneticists
Ludwig Maximilian University of Munich alumni
Academic staff of the Ludwig Maximilian University of Munich
People from Neu-Ulm
People from the Kingdom of Bavaria
Recipients of the Pour le Mérite (civil class)
Academic staff of the University of Jena
Members of the Royal Swedish Academy of Sciences

Members of the American Philosophical Society